"Something to Be Proud Of" is a song written by Jeffrey Steele and Chris Wallin, and recorded by American country music duo Montgomery Gentry. It was released in May 2005 as the fourth and final single from their album You Do Your Thing. The song reached the top of the Billboard Hot Country Songs chart on October 8, 2005.

Content
The father of the narrator compares the narrator's way of life as a father and a husband to his own achievements during the Desert Storm operation.

Critical reception
Kevin John Coyne, reviewing the song for Country Universe, gave it a negative rating. He summarized his review by saying the song is a "warmed-over, second-rate John Mellencamp."

Music video
The music video was directed by Wes Edwards and released on July 5, 2005.

Chart positions
"Something to Be Proud Of" debuted at number 56 on the U.S. Billboard Hot Country Songs for the week of May 21, 2005. It spent two weeks at number 1, making it the first single from Columbia Records Nashville to spend more than one week at the top since "Daddy's Money" by Ricochet in 1996. The song has sold 579,000 copies in the United States as of September 2017.

Year-end charts

References

2005 singles
Montgomery Gentry songs
Songs written by Jeffrey Steele
Music videos directed by Wes Edwards
Columbia Nashville Records singles
Songs written by Chris Wallin
2004 songs